Sobczak or Sobchak is a Polish surname. Notable people with the surname include:

 Adam Sobczak (born 1989), Polish rower
 Anatoly Sobchak (1937–2000), Russian legislator and mayor of Saint Petersburg
 Anna Sobczak (born 1967), Polish fencer
 Bogusław Sobczak (born 1979), Polish politician
 Ksenia Sobchak (born 1981), TV presenter, daughter of Anatoly
 Marcin Sobczak (born 1987), Polish football player
 Paweł Sobczak (born 1969), Polish field hockey player
 Ryszard Sobczak (born 1967), Polish fencer

Fictional characters 
 Walter Sobchak, a character in the film The Big Lebowski
 Sobchak (Better Call Saul)

See also 
 Sobczyk

Polish-language surnames